The attorney general of California is the state attorney general of the Government of California. The officer's duty is to ensure that "the laws of the state are uniformly and adequately enforced" (Constitution of California, Article V, Section 13). The California attorney general carries out the responsibilities of the office through the California Department of Justice. The department employs over 1,100 attorneys and 3,700 non-attorney employees.

The California attorney general is elected to a four-year term, with a maximum of two terms. The election is held at the same statewide election as the governor, lieutenant governor, controller, secretary of state, treasurer, superintendent of public instruction, and insurance commissioner. A few individual attorneys general have gone on to higher offices on the state and federal level, including the offices of governor, United States Senator, chief justice of the United States Supreme Court, and vice president of the United States.

On March 24, 2021, Governor Gavin Newsom announced that he would be appointing Rob Bonta as attorney general to succeed Xavier Becerra, who resigned the position to become Secretary of Health and Human Services under President Joe Biden. Bonta's appointment was subject to confirmation by both houses of the California State Legislature, and he was sworn in on April 23, 2021.

Duties

According to the state Constitution, the Code of Civil Procedure, and the Government Code, the attorney general:

As the state's chief law officer, ensures that the laws of the state are uniformly and adequately enforced.
Heads the Department of Justice, which is responsible for providing state legal services and support for local law enforcement.
Acts as the chief counsel in state litigation.
Oversees law enforcement agencies, including district attorneys and sheriffs.

History
Although the office of attorney general dates to the admission of California to the Union, the office in its modern form dates to Proposition 4 of 1934, sponsored by Alameda County District Attorney Earl Warren as one of four initiatives he sponsored to substantially reform law enforcement and the judiciary. Previously, the attorney general lacked jurisdiction over matters in the jurisdiction of locally elected district attorneys and sheriffs. Warren went on to become attorney general himself in 1938, reorganizing's the state's law enforcement into districts.

Diversity
Stanley Mosk was the first adherent of Judaism to hold the office.
George Deukmejian was the first Armenian American to hold the office.
Kamala Harris was the first woman, the first Asian American, and the first African American to hold the office.
Xavier Becerra was the first Latino to hold the office.
Rob Bonta is the first Filipino American to hold the office.

List of attorneys general of California

References

External links

California Attorney General articles at ABA Journal
News and Commentary at FindLaw

 
Attorney General